Mark Edward Brandon is an American lawyer and academic. He is the dean of the University of Alabama School of Law.

Early life
Mark E. Brandon was born in Georgia and grew up in Birmingham, Alabama. He graduated from the University of Montevallo. He earned a JD from the University of Alabama School of Law, followed by a master's degree from the University of Michigan and a PhD from Princeton University.

Career
Brandon was "an assistant attorney general for Alabama from 1978-1980, a staff attorney and consumer unit coordinator for Legal Services Corp. and has worked with private firms in Alabama and Michigan."

Brandon taught political science at the University of Michigan and the University of Oklahoma. He was a professor of Law and Political Science at the Vanderbilt University Law School until July 1, 2014, when he became the dean of the University of Alabama School of Law.

Brandon is the author of two books.

Selected works

References

Living people
Lawyers from Birmingham, Alabama
University of Montevallo alumni
University of Alabama School of Law alumni
University of Michigan alumni
Princeton University alumni
Vanderbilt University faculty
University of Alabama faculty
Deans of law schools in the United States
Year of birth missing (living people)